Princess Elisabeth Sybille of Saxe-Weimar-Eisenach (28 February 1854 – 10 July 1908) was the first wife of Duke Johann Albrecht of Mecklenburg, Regent of Mecklenburg-Schwerin and of the Duchy of Brunswick.

Early life
She was the youngest daughter of Karl Alexander, Grand Duke of Saxe-Weimar-Eisenach, and Princess Sophie of the Netherlands.

Marriage
Princess Elisabeth married Duke Johann Albrecht of Mecklenburg-Schwerin on 6 November 1886 in Weimar. Their marriage was childless. She died at Schloß Wiligrad, near Lübstorf, on 10 July 1908.

Ancestry

Honours
 Mecklenburg: Dame's Decoration of the House Order of the Wendish Crown, in Diamonds
 Russian Empire: Dame Grand Cross of the Order of Saint Catherine
 Ottoman Empire: Dame Grand Cordon of the Order of Charity
 Thailand: Dame Grand Cross of the Order of Chula Chom Klao

References

Literature 
 

1854 births
1908 deaths
Nobility from Weimar
House of Mecklenburg-Schwerin
Duchesses of Mecklenburg-Schwerin
Princesses of Saxe-Weimar-Eisenach
Daughters of monarchs